The Oso Landslide Memorial is a memorial for the forty-three victims of the 2014 Oso mudslide under construction in Snohomish County, Washington near the Whitehorse Trail. 

The Snohomish County Department of Parks, Recreation & Tourism announced on March 22, 2018, that plans had begun for a permanent memorial commemorating the victims.  The tribute is located at the location of the slide and fundraising efforts began in 2018 with wood from the formerly standing memorial tree to be repurposed and used for the permanent display.

The $6 million memorial was funded by Snonhomish County in March, 2022. Construction began in October, 2022, and the county plans to complete it in time for a commemoration in 2024, ten years after the slide.

References

Sources

External links

Monuments and memorials in Washington (state)
2022 establishments in Washington (state)